Jeffrey Lane Hephner (born 1975) is an American actor, best known for the role of Jeff Clarke, first on the NBC television series Chicago Fire and then on its sister show, Chicago Med.  More recently, he co-starred with Jennifer Garner in the action thriller film Peppermint. He also appears in the 2016 National Geographic TV series MARS and the Apple TV+ original science fiction space drama series For All Mankind. In January 2019, he co-starred in the film An Acceptable Loss. In 2023, he began hosting the game show Switch on Game Show Network.

Hephner has appeared in over 50 other films and television shows, including as Morgan Stanley Buffkin in the CW series Easy Money (2008–2009), and as Ben Zajac in the Starz political drama Boss (2011–2012). In 2015, he starred as the title character in the short-lived TNT action drama Agent X.

Early life
Hephner was born in Adrian, Michigan to Tom and Patti Hephner, and grew up in the small town of Sand Creek, in southern Michigan near Adrian. Hephner was athletic growing up, playing basketball and football, and he graduated from Sand Creek High School. Hephner was named to the all-state team for Class C-D for the 1993–1994 season.

He attended and played basketball for Calvin College in Grand Rapids, Michigan for two years before transferring to Ferris State University in Big Rapids, Michigan for two years.

Career
Hephner began his Hollywood career with small roles in two feature films, Tigerland (2000) and Maid in Manhattan (2002). After starring in the short-lived Fox series The Jury in 2004, in 2005, he guest-starred in the NBC series Law & Order: Criminal Intent in season 4: episode 21 titled "The Unblinking Eye". Hephner starred as author Pat Conroy in the Hallmark Hall of Fame TV movie The Water Is Wide (2006), based on Conroy's book and a remake of the drama Conrack (1974).

He starred in The CW series Easy Money, which aired for four episodes in October 2008 before being cancelled. The other four episodes aired in mid-2009. Following the cancellation of Easy Money, Hephner guest-starred in Private Practice, CSI: Crime Scene Investigation, NCIS, Castle and had a recurring role in four episodes of the NBC medical drama Mercy. In 2010, Hephner replaced Ben Browder in a recurring role in the CW series Hellcats as football coach Red Raymond.

BuddyTV ranked Hephner #86 on its list of "TV's Sexiest Men of 2011". In 2011, Hephner was cast in the NBC series The Playboy Club, but was replaced by Eddie Cibrian before filming began. From 2011 to 2012, Hephner played Ben Zajac in the Starz political drama series Boss. From 2013 to 2014, Hephner had a recurring role in the second season of the NBC drama Chicago Fire. In 2015, Hephner co-starred with Sharon Stone in the TNT series Agent X.

From 2016 to 2017, Hephner reprised his role as Jeff Clarke in Chicago Fire'''s medical spinoff Chicago Med'', where Clarke returns to medical school. He appeared in the first season finale and recurred in the show until towards the end of the second season.

Filmography

References

External links
 

 Juba, Scott. – "Interview: Jeff Hephner: The Water Is Wide in The O.C.". – the Trades. – January 27, 2006.

1975 births
Living people
American men's basketball players
Basketball players from Michigan
Calvin University alumni
Ferris State Bulldogs men's basketball players
Male actors from Michigan
People from Adrian, Michigan
Calvin Knights men's basketball players